Tell Taya is an archaeological site at a tell (hill city) in Nineveh Province (Iraq). It was occupied from the third to the first millennia BCE.

History of archaeological research
The site was first recorded by Seton Lloyd in 1938 during his survey of the region.  Tell Taya was excavated by a team from the British School of Archaeology in Iraq led by J. E. Reade in 1967–1969 and 1972–1973. Numerous stone structures were investigated, and pottery, along with a few tablets and cylinder seals, were recovered in the 9 layers. One of the cylinder seals, made of terracotta, was quite unusual, containing only cuneiform writing which has not yet been deciphered.

Tell Taya and its environment

The location controls a formerly rich agricultural area and an important trade route.

Occupation history
The site was heavily occupied on and off during the second half of the 3rd millennium, with some re-use in the Old Babylonian period and the Neo-Assyrian period. There is some evidence of Early Dynastic occupation, but major building at Tell Taya began around the time that the Akkadian Empire emerges.

See also

Cities of the ancient Near East
Tell al-Rimah
Tell Khoshi

References

Further reading
John Curtis, Fifty Years of Mesopotamian Discovery, the Work of the British School of Archaeology in Iraq, 1932–1982, British School of Archaeology in Iraq, 1982, 
Reade, J. E., "Tell Taya", pp. 72–78 in Fifty Years of Mesopotamian Discovery. The work of the British School of Archaeology in Iraq 1932–1982, ed. J. Curtis.. London: Stephen Austin and Sons Ltd., 1982
David Oates, The Excavations at Tell al Rimah: 1964, Iraq, vol. 27, no. 2, pp. 62–68, 1965
Waines, J. G., " Plant remains from Tell Taya.", Iraq 35, pp. 185-187, 1973

External links
Tortoise figurine from Tell Taya - Metropolitan Museum
Map Showing Location of Tell Taya

Taya
Taya
Taya